Halicmetus is a fish genus in the family Ogcocephalidae. This genus of ray-finned fish has a uniform gray to black color. Halicmetus have a max length of 8.7 centimeters and live in marine bathydemersal from 280–1000 meters deep and can be found in the Western Pacific: Japan, Taiwan, and eastern Australia.

Species
There are currently three recognized species in this genus:
 Halicmetus niger H. C. Ho, Endo & Sakamaki, 2008
 Halicmetus reticulatus H. M. Smith & Radcliffe, 1912 (Marbled seabat)
 Halicmetus ruber Alcock, 1891

References

Ogcocephalidae
Marine fish genera
Taxa named by Alfred William Alcock